Sunday's Illness is a 2018 Spanish drama film directed by Ramón Salazar which stars Bárbara Lennie and Susi Sánchez alongside Greta Fernández, Richard Bohringer and Miguel Ángel Solá. It was screened in the Panorama section at the 68th Berlin International Film Festival.

Plot
Anabel is hosting a large dinner party and recognises one of the catering staff as Chiara, the daughter she has not seen since she abandoned her at the age of eight over thirty years ago. She arranges to meet Chiara to find out why she has re-appeared. Chiara requests that she spend 10 days with her. Anabel's husband and the family lawyer are suspicious of Chiara's motives, but after she agrees to sign a contract waiving any rights she had as a family member, they agree to the plan. Before leaving, Anabel informs her other, younger, daughter that she has a half-sister, who then asks her to be kind to Chiara.

Chiara drives Anabel into the countryside to a remote community where she lives in her childhood home. During the following days the tensions build between the two women, and Chiara refuses to reveal what she wants to achieve, saying that she doesn't need or want to forgive Anabel. Chiara becomes drunk during a party at the local town and passes out for over a day. After giving Anabel some magic mushroom infused tea, she tells her that she is seriously ill. The next day, during an excursion on a sled, Chiara becomes sick and is taken to hospital. Anabel is told the extent of Chiara's condition by the staff.

They return home and Anabel asks Chiara how she can help her. Chiara states that she only wants one thing and if Anabel won't do it she can leave. She whispers in Anabel's ear and immediately afterwards Anabel packs her belongings and departs. She travels to Paris and meets with Chiara's father. They discuss their previous relationship in dispassionate terms, before the conversation turns to Chiara. Her father said that he offered to help her but she refused. Anabel returns to the farmhouse and finds Chiara collapsed but conscious nearby. She tenderly undresses her and carries her into the lake. Chiara says that she is not afraid and Anabel slowly lowers her into the water, holding her under until she stops struggling.

Cast

Production 
Sunday's Illness is a Zeta Cinema and On Cinema 2017 production, and it had collaboration from RTVE, TV3, ICAA, ICEC and ICO. Filming began on 20 February 2017 in Barcelona.

Release 
The film was presented at the 68th Berlin International Film Festival (Berlinale) in February 2018, screened out in the Panorama section. Distributed by Caramel Films, the film was theatrically released in Spain on 23 February 2018.

Reception

Wendy Ide of ScreenDaily wrote that "both [Sánchez and Lennie's] performances are phenomenally good; the two women who at first seem like opposites are gradually drawn together by something primal and unbreakable".

Jonathan Holland of The Hollywood Reporter described the film as "beautifully crafted, spectral and emotionally punchy", also considering that it is "marvelously played by Spanish actors Susi Sanchez and Barbara Lennie".

Accolades 

|-
| align = "center" rowspan = "6" | 2019 || rowspan = "3" | 6th Feroz Awards || Best Director || Ramón Salazar ||  || rowspan = "3" | 
|-
| Best Original Score || Nico Casal || 
|-
| Best Film Poster || Jordi Rins || 
|-
| 33rd Goya Awards || Best Actress || Susi Sánchez ||  || 
|-
| rowspan = "2" | 28th Actors and Actresses Union Awards || rowspan = "2" | Best Film Actress in a Leading Role || Susi Sánchez ||  || rowspan = "2" | 
|-
| Bárbara Lennie || 
|}

See also 
 List of Spanish films of 2018

References

External links
 

2018 films
2018 drama films
Spanish drama films
2010s Spanish-language films
Zeta Studios films
Films shot in Barcelona
2010s Spanish films